The Hohe Matze, also known as the Hohe Mätze, is a mountain in the southern part of the Fichtel Mountains of central Germany. There are numerous trails through its wooded slopes.

On the Hohe Matze was once supposed to have been the castle of Karlstein, but there is no record of it in historical documents. Its name, given in 1393 as mazen, and later as meze or mätze, translates into high German as Weideberg or "willow mountain".

The watershed between the North Sea and the Black Sea runs over the Hohe Matze, as does the 50th parallel and the Höhenweg walking trail.

References

External links

 Photos of a climb up the Hohe Matze and the surrounding area 
 Information on the tourist information website of the Fichtelgebirge 
 Map of the whole Fichtelgebirge – including location of the Hohe Matze 

Mountains of the Fichtelgebirge
Mountains of Bavaria
Mountains under 1000 metres